Byström is a Swedish surname. Notable people with the surname include:

Johan Niclas Byström  (1783–1848), Swedish sculptor
Malin Byström, Swedish operatic soprano
Margaretha Byström, Swedish actress, writer and director
Oscar Byström (composer) (1821–1909), Swedish composer and scholar
Oscar Byström (actor) (1857–1938), Swedish actor
Thomas Byström (1893–1979), Swedish equestrian

See also
Bystrom, California, a census-designated place in Stanislaus County, California

Swedish-language surnames